Craugastor rhyacobatrachus is a species of frogs in the family Craugastoridae. It is found in the Pacific slopes of the Talamanca-Barú Massif of Costa Rica and western Panama. The specific name rhyacobatrachus is derived from Greek batrachos (for "frog") and rhyaco ("torrent"), in reference to the torrential streams that this species inhabits.

Description
Adult males measure  and adult females  in snout–vent length. The snout is subelliptical to elliptical from above and rounded in profile. The upper eye is covered with large tubercles. The tympanum is distinct. The fingers have large discs and weak lateral fringes. The toes have large discs, definite fringes, and are heavily webbed. Skin is dorsally very rugose. The dorsum is tan to olive brown, heavily spotted or blotched with even darker markings. The posterior thigh surface has pale yellow and brown mottling. The venter is pale yellow and is heavily marked brown, as is the throat and chest.

Habitat and conservation
It is associated with rocks and waterfalls, normally found at night sitting or foraging on rocks in mountain streams. This species was once quite common where it occurred. It appears to have gone extinct in Costa Rica, where, as of 2007, it has not been seen after 1964. It is also believed to have declined in Panama. In addition to habitat loss, the decline is assumed to be caused by chytridiomycosis.

References

rhyacobatrachus
Frogs of North America
Amphibians of Costa Rica
Amphibians of Panama
Endangered fauna of North America
Taxa named by Jonathan A. Campbell
Taxa named by Jay M. Savage
Amphibians described in 2000
Taxonomy articles created by Polbot